Delphacodes is a genus of delphacid planthoppers in the family Delphacidae. There are more than 100 described species in Delphacodes, found worldwide.

See also
 List of Delphacodes species

References

External links

 

Delphacini
Articles created by Qbugbot